Colin Anfield Hughes (4 May 1930 – 30 June 2017) was a distinguished British-Australian academic specialising in electoral politics and government.  He was Emeritus professor of political science at the University of Queensland, and chairman of the Queensland Constitutional Review Commission (1999–2000).

Hughes was born in The Bahamas, where his Welsh father, John Anfield Hughes, was a school administrator, and later district commissioner of several Bahamian islands. During World War II, he moved to the United States, where he received his B.A. and M.A. degrees from Columbia University and his PhD from the London School of Economics. In 1966, along with John S. Western, Hughes published a study of Australia's first ever televised policy speech on 12 November 1963, by then prime minister Sir Robert Menzies. At this time, Hughes was a Fellow in Political Science at the Australian National University. At time of the 1966 publication, he was a Professor of Political Science and Western Senior Lecturer in Political Science at the University of Queensland.

Their study comprised 250 voters who viewed the policy speech, examined the effect of this form of political communication, and traced its impact on the knowledge, attitudes, and opinions of this group. This was the first such detailed study undertaken in Australia, providing a testing of theories of cognitive equilibrium in relation to voting behaviour, and an examination of television's use in political communication.

Hughes was the first Australian Electoral Commissioner at the Australian Electoral Commission from 1984 to 1989 (in 1984 the AEC replaced the Australian Electoral Office, which had existed since 1902).

Works

References

External links

1930 births
2017 deaths
Australian public servants
Academic staff of the University of Queensland
Academic staff of the Australian National University
Australian Electoral Commissioners
Australian people of Welsh descent
British emigrants to Australia
Bahamian emigrants to Australia
Columbia College (New York) alumni
Columbia Graduate School of Arts and Sciences alumni